Gail Marion Daley (born April 5, 1946) is a Canadian retired artistic gymnast who competed at the 1964 Olympics. She won two medals at the 1963 Pan American Games and four national titles starting from 1962.

References

1946 births
Living people
Canadian female artistic gymnasts
Gymnasts at the 1964 Summer Olympics
Olympic gymnasts of Canada
Sportspeople from Saskatoon
Canadian rhythmic gymnasts
Pan American Games silver medalists for Canada
Pan American Games bronze medalists for Canada
Pan American Games medalists in gymnastics
Gymnasts at the 1963 Pan American Games
Medalists at the 1963 Pan American Games
20th-century Canadian women
21st-century Canadian women